This is a list of properties and districts in Effingham County, Georgia that are listed on the National Register of Historic Places (NRHP).

Current listings

|}

References

Effingham
Buildings and structures in Effingham County, Georgia
History of Effingham County, Georgia
Tourist attractions in Effingham County, Georgia